R (Reilly and Wilson) v Secretary of State for Work and Pensions [2013] UKSC 68 is a United Kingdom constitutional law and labour law case that found the conduct of the Department for Work and Pensions "workfare" policy was unlawful. Caitlin Reilly, an unemployed geology graduate, and Jamieson Wilson, an unemployed driver, challenged the Jobcentre policy of making the unemployed work for private companies to get unemployment income. The outcome of the case affects over 3,000 claimants and entails around £130m unpaid benefits.

Facts
Ms Reilly claimed that the Secretary of State had acted ultra vires by forcing her to attend two weeks of 'training' and work for another two weeks at Poundland without pay, just in order to receive Jobseeker's Allowance. Under the new Jobseekers Act 1995 s. 17A, the Secretary of State could write regulations for claimants to get JSA in prescribed circumstances, and to be require to take part in schemes of a "prescribed description", which under section 35 meant "determined in accordance with regulations". The Secretary of State wrote the Jobseeker's Allowance (Employment, Skills and Enterprise Scheme) Regulations 2011 where regulation 2 said schemes were to assist claimants to get employment, but did not contain any description of the scheme. Under regulation 4(2)(c)(e) claimants were supposed to be given written notice of what they were "required to do" and information about the consequences of failing to do so. After, the SS announced sub-schemes and issued guidance to Jobcentre advisers to give claimants "full details" of available schemes. Reilly received no written notification requiring her to join a scheme, but was simply told by a Jobcentre adviser that training and Poundland was mandatory.

In a joined case, Mr Wilson was given written notice requiring his participation in a scheme for the long-term employed and that his income "may be stopped for up to 26 weeks" if he did not take part. The Jobcentre refused to give any more information. He refused to take part and his income was stopped for 6 months.

Reilly and Wilson claimed the Regulations should be quashed because (1) they were ultra vires JSA 1995 s. 17A because they failed to prescribe a description of the scheme; (2) there was a failure to comply with the notice provisions in reg. 4; and (3) enforcing the Regulations was unlawful without a published policy on the nature of the scheme and unpaid work. Reilly added that (4) needing to take unpaid work was forced labour contrary to the European Convention on Human Rights article 4.

Judgment

High Court
On 6 August 2012, the High Court ruled (contrary to the arguments of Reilly and Wilson) that the scheme could not be considered slavery, and was not therefore a breach of Article 4 of the European Convention on Human Rights. On the other hand, it also ruled that the Department for Work and Pensions had breached its Regulation 4 (which required certain details of the Work Programme to be given to participants in writing).

Both parties expressed their wish to appeal the judgement.

Court of Appeal
On 12 February 2013, the decision of the High Court was overturned on appeal, with the Court of Appeal ruling that the work placement system was unlawful because Parliament had not given the DWP lawful authority to impose such schemes and because the people involved were not provided with sufficient information about it. The Court of Appeal quashed the Jobseeker's Allowance (Employment, Skills and Enterprise Scheme) Regulations 2011. The court did not state whether or not the current case impinges on Article 4 of the European Convention on Human Rights.

The government appealed the judgment, but on 30 October 2013, the decision of the Appeal Court was upheld by the Supreme Court.

Supreme Court
The Supreme Court held there had been no contravention of Article 4 of the European Convention on Human Rights, but since the court ruled against workfare the comments regarding the human rights do not form part of the reasons for the judgment and therefore are not legally binding.

Lord Neuberger and Lord Toulson wrote the following:

Lord Clarke, Lord Mance and Lord Sumption agreed.

Significance

Reactions
The findings of the court have been judged to indicate a shift in the nature of "the relationship between social rights and obligations in the context of unemployment policy" in the UK: the founder of the modern UK welfare state, William Beveridge, conceived the classical welfare state as freeing people from Want, while obliging them to work when possible. Kenneth Veitch has argued the rulings in Reilly v Secretary of State imply that Want is now used as a threat to ensure that welfare claimants habituate themselves to the demands of the contemporary workplace.

Subsequent litigation
On 19 March 2013, before the appeal to the Supreme Court was completed, the Government also passed the Jobseekers (Back to Work Schemes) Act 2013 to retrospectively make its unlawful sanctions against benefits claimants legal, in order to avoid potentially having to repay unlawfully withheld benefits payments of around £130m.

In response to the law change, the law firm acting for Reilly and Wilson, Public Interest Lawyers, lodged submissions to the Supreme Court, arguing that "the actions of the secretary of state ... represent a clear violation of article 6 [of the European Convention on Human Rights] and the rule of law, as an interference in the judicial process by the legislature".

On Friday 4 July 2014, Mrs Justice Lang, sitting at the High Court in London, ruled that the retrospective nature of the legislation interfered with the "right to a fair trial" under Article Six of the Convention on Human Rights. The government appealed this ruling, but on 29 April 2016, the Court of Appeal upheld the previous court's decision; Lord Justice Underhill, summarising the court's findings, emphasised that although the Act was incompatible with the European Convention on Human Rights, "it is up to the Government, subject to any further appeal, to decide what action to take in response".

See also
Work Programme (United Kingdom)
Workfare
Unemployment in the United Kingdom
Youth unemployment in the United Kingdom
Jobseekers (Back to Work Schemes) Act 2013

Notes

References
A Paz-Fuchs and A Eleveld, 'Workfare Revisited' (2016) 45(1) Industrial Law Journal 29
E McGaughey, A Casebook on Labour Law (Hart 2019) ch 16, 723

Unemployment in the United Kingdom
Workfare in the United Kingdom
2013 in British law
2013 in case law
Supreme Court of the United Kingdom cases
United Kingdom labour case law
United Kingdom constitutional case law